Feliks Brzozowski (1836 in Warsaw – 1892 in Warsaw) was a Polish painter and illustrator.

In the years of 1852–1859, Feliks studied at the Academy of Fine Arts in Warsaw under the guidance of Chrystian Breslauer. He mainly painted landscape art, predominantly in the forest motif. During his travels around Poland, his landscape artwork centred around the localities of Ojców and the Tatra mountains, as well as castles. Feliks Brzozowski's travels abroad (to Crimea and the Alps) have not featured in his artwork. The artwork that the artist did create, he sent to the Society of Friends of Fine Arts in Kraków, while in Warsaw, many of his works featured in Krywult's Saloon and since its founding, the Society of the Encouragement of Fine Arts. Since 1865, he published his work in Warsaw's news journals (Tygodnik Illustrowany, Biesiada Literacka and Kłosy).

References

External links 

1836 births
1892 deaths
19th-century Polish painters
19th-century Polish male artists
Polish male painters